The homicide at the Brazilian Federal Senate was a historic event that happened in December 4, 1963 inside the Brazilian Federal Senate, at Brasília. The event is characterized by a murder carried out by Senator  (PDC-AL), who tried to shoot Senator  (PSD-AL) and ended up hitting and killing the substitute Senator  (PSD-AC).

Background

The confusion began some time before, with discussions between Senators Arnon de Melo and Silvestre Pericles, because both were from families with certain political notoriety in the state of Alagoas, the rise of both families in politics ended up generating a certain conflict.

This ascension affected mainly the Pericles, who had been in regional and federal political positions longer than the Mello's, who would later occupy more relevant positions with the arrival of Fernando Collor de Mello, Arnon's son, to the presidency of Brazil.

Then Pericles had been provoking Arnon, who, to defend himself from a supposed threat, started carrying a gun.

Shooting
Arnon, who had attended few sessions of the Senate, was provoked by Pericles to attend even the federal session on December 4, 1963.

After these provocations, Arnon came to the session armed. Knowing the risk he was taking, Pericles also came to the session armed.

After asking for the floor, Arnon made a speech talking about the threats he and his family were facing, and when Pericles started to advance, Arnon shot him. Pericles threw himself on the ground, drawing his gun, but  prevented him from shooting Arnon.

After the shooting, it was found that a third senator who was trying to break up the fight was hit. That senator was José Kairala, from the state of Acre and from the same party as Pericles.

Because it was his last session in the Federal Senate, Kairala had brought his wife and children to attend the session. He died at the hospital later that day. Because of the confusion, the session was canceled until further notice by its president, Auro de Moura Andrade.

Consequences

Both senators were taken to the police station to give their statements. After the statements, Senator Arnon remained in custody and in possession of his revolver.

After a few hours in jail, Arnon was released with the promise to attend a hearing, where he was released on the grounds of self-defense and the death was treated as an accident.

Kairala's widow tried to get Arnon to pay for her son's school expenses, but her request was unsuccessful.

Other cases
On December 26, 1929, when the Federal District was still in Rio de Janeiro, congressman  shot and killed rival , allegedly to defend his son. He was acquitted.

On June 8, 1967, in the Chamber of Deputies, deputy  retaliated against a slap he was slapped by deputy  after they had argued over the presidency of the Parliamentary Union a few days earlier, by shooting Souto Maior. Both survived and were later acquitted.

References

1963 murders in Brazil
Federal Senate
1963 in politics